Michael Kefalianos, first name also spelt Michalis and Mihalis, is a Greek bodybuilder with Greek and Australian dual citizenship who is an International Federation of BodyBuilders (IFBB) professional bodybuilder. He is widely considered to be the best Greek bodybuilder. In 2009 at the IFBB Australian Pro Grand Prix he placed fourth and became the first Greek bodybuilder to ever qualify for the Mr. Olympia competition, which is held in Las Vegas once a year in September. He has since competed in more than 35 professional bodybuilding shows, with his career highlight the 2012 Mr. Europe win in Madrid, Spain.

Life, training, and amateur career
He was born on the island of Kos in 1971. After compulsory Greek Army service he started bodybuilding at 20 years of age. He lived in Adelaide, Australia for four years with his Greek Australian wife Helen, daughter of immigrants from Kos, and they have four children. He returned to Kos with his family. Between 1998 and 2007 Michael was a regular winner of the Mr. Aegean and Mr. Hellas competitions. He now owns Olympian Gym Kos on Kos Island Greece where he still lives and has retired from competitive bodybuilding.

IFBB Pro bodybuilder
On 22 November 2008 he came first in the International North German Championship in Hamburg and earned his IFBB pro card by defeating other bodybuilders who had already earned their IFBB pro cards.

Participation at Mr. Olympia
He qualified for Mr. Olympia on his IFBB pro debut at the 2009 IFBB Australia Grand Prix. He participated and ranked joint 16th in the IFBB Mr. Olympia contest in September 2009 for Australia. He participated in 2010 Mr. Olympia contest but was not placed. He qualified for 2011 Mr. Olympia at the 2011 IFBB Australia Grand Prix. The 2012 season started with Michael's invitation to his first Arnold Classic in Ohio, where he placed 9th. In March 2012 he placed 2nd to Branch Warren at the Australian Grand Prix and qualified for his 3rd Mr. Olympia. The highlight of his career came on 28 April 2012, in Madrid, Spain where Michael won his first professional bodybuilding competition, the 2012 Mr. Europe Pro.

Competitive history

Amateur career
2008 International North German Championship in Hamburg – 1st
2009 NPC Arnold Classic Amateur Championships – 3rd (earned IFBB Pro card at this event)

Pro career
2009 IFBB Australia Pro Grand Prix IX – 4th (qualified for entry to Mr. Olympia)
2009 IFBB New York Pro – 11th
2009 IFBB Mr. Olympia – joint 16th
2010 IFBB Australia Pro Grand Prix X – 4th
2010 IFBB Orlando Europa Show of Champions – 4th
2010 IFBB Tampa Pro Bodybuilding Weekly Championships – 5th
2010 IFBB Hartford Europa Battle of Champions – 4th
2010 IFBB Dallas Europa Super Show – 5th
2010 IFBB Mr. Europe Pro – 6th
2011 IFBB Australia Pro Grand Prix XI – 3rd (qualified for entry to Mr. Olympia)
2011 IFBB British Grand Prix I Open Class – 5th
2011 IFBB FIBO Power Pro Germany – 5th
2011 IFBB New York Pro – 6th 
 2011 IFBB Mr. Olympia – 16th
 2011 IFBB Sheru Classic – 7th
 2011 IFBB Arnold Classic Europe – 8th
 2012 IFBB Arnold Classic – 9th
 2012 IFBB Australian Grand Prix – 2nd
 2012 IFBB FIBO Power Pro – 2nd
 2012 IFBB Mr. Europe Pro – Winner
 2012 IFBB Mr. Olympia – 16th 
 2012 IFBB Sheru Classic – 5th 
 2012 IFBB Arnold Classic Europe – 8th 
 2012 IFBB EVLS Prague Pro – 9th
 2012 IFBB Masters Olympia – 6th
 2013 IFBB Arnold Classic – 12th
 2013 IFBB Australian Grand Prix – 6th
 2013 IFBB FIBO Power Pro – 7th
 2013 IFBB Arnold Classic Brazil – 7th
 2013 IFBB Mr. Europe Pro – 4th
 2013 IFBB Arnold Classic Europe – 12th
 2014 IFBB Arnold Classic Brazil - 8th
 2014 IFBB New York Pro - 7th
 2014 IFBB Arnold Classic Europe - 9th
 2014 IFBB Fitness House Pro Russian Grand Prix - 9th
 2015 IFBB Arnold Classic - 13th
 2015 IFBB Arnold Classic Europe - 13th 
 2015 IFBB EVLS Prague Pro - 13th
 2016 IFBB Levrone Pro Classic - 7th 
 2016 IFBB BodyPower Pro UK - 3rd
 2016 IFBB New York Pro - 11th
 2016 IFBB Arnold Classic Africa - 6th
 2016 IFBB Arnold Classic Asia - 12th
 2016 IFBB Arnold Classic Europe - 15th 
 2016 IFBB Olympia Europe - 8th
 2018 IFBB New York Pro - 16th 
 2018 IFBB EVLS Prague Pro - 11th

Sponsorship history
Scitec Nutrition (inactive)
Healthy2Day.gr (inactive)
Bodybuilders.gr – The Largest Greek Bodybuilding & Fitness Site On The Web.
MHP - Maximum Human Performance (inactive)

See also 
List of male professional bodybuilders
List of female professional bodybuilders

References

External links
 Michael Kefalianos Official Website
 Michael Kefalianos 2011 Mr. Olympia Preview
 "Ask The Pro" With Michael Kefalianos
 Fan club
 Michael Kefalianos' Posing Routine Arnold Classic 2012
 Michael Kefalianos Training Shoulders – April 2012
 Michael Kefalianos Training Back Plus Interview With His Coach David Balasas
 Posing Routine From Michael Kefalianos' First Pro Win
 Chest Training Video 5 Weeks Prior To The 2012 Mr. Olympia
 Interview After the 2012 Masters Olympia
 Training Delts Prior To The 2013 Arnold Classic Europe
 Photos 3 Days Out From The 2013 Arnold Europe
 Mike Kefalianos Back Workout Video - October 2014
 Michael Kefalianos Posing Routine Arnold Classic 2015
 Michael Kefalianos Posing At Scitec Muscle Beach 2016
 Michael Kefalianos Never Before Seen Training Footage
 Michael Kefalianos Interview & News - November 2017
 Τελευταίος Αγώνας Για Τον Μιχάλη Κεφαλιανό; - Μάιος 2018

1970 births
Living people
People from Kos
Greek bodybuilders
Australian bodybuilders
Australian people of Greek descent
Professional bodybuilders